
The Shandong Problem or Shandong Question (Japanese: , Santō mondai) was a dispute over Article 156 of the Treaty of Versailles in 1919, which dealt with the concession of the Shandong Peninsula. It was resolved in China's favor in 1922.

During the First World War (1914–1918), China supported the Allies on condition that the Kiautschou Bay Leased Territory on the Shandong peninsula, which had belonged to the German Empire prior to its occupation by Japan in 1914, would be returned to China. In 1915, however, China reluctantly agreed to thirteen of Japan's original Twenty-One Demands which, among other things, acknowledged Japanese control of former German holdings. Britain and France promised Japan it could keep these holdings. In late 1918, China reaffirmed the transfer and accepted payments from Japan. Article 156 of the Treaty of Versailles transferred the territory of Kiautschou as well as the rights, titles and privileges acquired by virtue of the Sino-German treaty of 1898 to the Empire of Japan rather than return them to the Chinese administration.

Despite its formal agreement to Japan's terms in 1915 and 1918, China denounced the transfer of German holdings at the Paris Peace Conference in 1919, with the strong support of President Woodrow Wilson of the United States. The Chinese ambassador to France, Wellington Koo, stated that China could no more relinquish Shandong, which was the birthplace of Confucius, the greatest Chinese philosopher, than could Christians concede Jerusalem. He demanded the promised return of Shandong, but to no avail. Japan prevailed. Chinese popular outrage over Article 156 led to demonstrations on 4 May 1919 and a cultural movement known as the May Fourth Movement. As a result, Wellington Koo refused to sign the treaty.

The US, finding itself isolated by all Great Powers, agreed to the Japanese, British and French demands. The Chinese public became outraged by the eventual treaty, accusing the Chinese government of selling out, and became disappointed by Wilson's failed promises.

China's refusal to sign the Treaty of Versailles necessitated a separate peace treaty with Germany in 1921. The Shandong dispute was mediated by the United States in 1922 during the Washington Naval Conference. In a victory for China, the Japanese leasehold on Shandong was returned to China in the Nine-Power Treaty. Japan, however, maintained its economic dominance of the railway and the province as a whole. When its dominance in the province was threatened by the ongoing Northern Expedition to unite China in 1927–1928, Japan launched a series of military interventions, culminating in the Jinan incident conflict with Chinese Nationalist soldiers.

See also
 Sino-German cooperation (1926–1941)
Treaty of Versailles
Paris Peace Conference

Notes

References

Further reading
 Burkman, Thomas W. Japan and the League of Nations: Empire and world order, 1914–1938 (U of Hawaii Press, 2007). 
 Craft, Stephen G. "John Bassett Moore, Robert Lansing, and the Shandong Question," Pacific Historical Review (1997) 66#2 pp. 231-249 in JSTOR
 Elleman, Bruce A. Wilson and China: a revised history of the Shandong question (ME Sharpe, 2002)
 Fifield, Russell Hunt. Woodrow Wilson and the Far East: the diplomacy of the Shantung question (1952)
 Griswold, A. Whitney The Far Eastern Policy of the United States (1938) pp 239-68
 Kawamura, Noriko. "Wilsonian idealism and Japanese claims at the Paris Peace Conference," Pacific Historical Review (1997) 66#4 pp 503-526.
 MacMillan, Margaret. Paris 1919: Six months that changed the world (2001) pp  322-44.
 Pugach, Noel H. "American Friendship for China and the Shantung Question at the Washington Conference," Journal of American History (1977) 64#1 pp 67-86. in JSTOR

Foreign relations of the Republic of China (1912–1949)
Treaty of Versailles
China–Japan relations
Territorial disputes of Japan
Territorial disputes of the Republic of China